New Life Academy of Woodbury is a private Christian school located in Woodbury, Minnesota, United States. The school is available for preschool through 12th grade and there are about 750 students. 
New Life Academy of Woodbury, along with New Life Church of Woodbury, was founded in 1977 by Pastor Dick and Patti Wiens.  New Life Academy is still closely tied to New Life Church. It is the largest Christian school in the eastern Twin Cities metro area.

Academics
New Life Academy offers several different types of student services which include support services, guidance counseling and a summer language program for international students

Extracurricular activities
Students may participate in a variety of clubs and athletic teams.

Clubs and Activities
Chess Club
Young Author Conference
Band
School of Fine Arts (SOFA)
Knowledge Bowl
Robotics
NHS

Athletics
New Life Academy's Athletic Affiliations include the MCAA (Minnesota Christian Athletic Association) and the MSHSL

Fall Sports
Cheerleading
Football - Junior High, Junior Varsity, and Varsity
Soccer – Boys Junior Varsity and Varsity, and Girls Junior Varsity and Varsity
Tennis – Girls Junior Varsity and Varsity
Volleyball (Girls) – Junior High, Junior Varsity, and Varsity

Winter Sports
Basketball – Boys 6th grade, 7th grade, 8th grade, C team, Junior Varsity and Varsity.
Basketball– Girls 6th grade, 7th grade, 8th grade, Junior Varsity and Varsity.
Cheerleading- Varsity Sideline

Spring Sports
Baseball – Junior High, Junior Varsity, and Varsity
Golf – Boys Junior Varsity and Varsity
Softball – Junior High and Varsity
Tennis– Boys Varsity
Track and Field – Junior High and Varsity
The Academy also provides athletic opportunities to those in the surrounding community.  A variety of summer sports camps available.

Music and Fine Arts 
Band
High School Choir
Morningstar
Junior High Choir
Elementary Music
Worship Choir
Visual Arts
Performing Arts
SOFA (School of Fine Arts)
New Life News

References

External links
Official Website
School Profile
New Life 4 U
MSHSL

1977 establishments in Minnesota
Christian schools in Minnesota
Educational institutions established in 1977
Private schools in Minnesota